This is a list of former airline hubs of major passenger airlines.

North America

Active airlines

Defunct airlines

* Now closed Stapleton International Airport has been replaced by Denver International Airport as the only major airport serving Denver, however, Continental Airlines did not have hub operations at Denver International.

Europe

Active airlines

Defunct airlines

Oceania

Defunct airlines

References 

Hubs, former
Airline hubs